The Walangama were an indigenous Australian people of the state of Queensland.

Language
Walangama, now extinct, was one of the Paman languages. William Armit, a local police inspector writing in the 1880s, stated that Walangama differed markedly from all of the surrounding tribal languages, stating:
It is most unusual to find a language which differs so much from its neighbours and those of Australia generally as this.'

Norman Tindale says that an extensive vocabulary of Walangama was collected from informants in 1938.

Country
Their western borders lay around Maggieville and Normanton, while to the east, their frontier was at Croydon. To their south, their confines were around the headwaters of Belmore Creek, and their northern extension ran up to Stirling along the southern side of the Gilbert River.

People
The district Police Inspector William Armit, writing in 1882, wrote that they were:
bold and hostile, fine athletic fellows, of a coppery color, with curly hair, who make frequent raids on their neighbours, and murder a White man now and then when opportunity offers.

Alternative names
 Karan (scrublanders)
 Wahlongman
 Wallankammer
 Wollangama
 Wollangama
 Wollongurmee

Some words
  ('mother')
  ('tame dog')
  ('white man')
  ('father')

Source:

Notes

Citations

Sources

Aboriginal peoples of Queensland